Two United States Senate elections in Connecticut were held on November 5, 1946, to determine the next United States Senator from Connecticut. One election determined who would complete the remainder of deceased Senator Francis T. Maloney's term and the other was for the regularly-scheduled term from 1947 to 1953.

Republican Governor of Connecticut Raymond E. Baldwin won both elections. In the special election, he defeated former Governor Wilbur Cross. In the regularly-scheduled election, Baldwin defeated Democratic Assistant Secretary of Labor Joseph Tone.

Background
Senator Maloney died on January 16, 1945. Former Admiral Thomas C. Hart was appointed to serve in his place as Senator until a duly-elected successor could be named.

Special election

Candidates
Raymond Baldwin, Governor of Connecticut (Republican)
Frederic C. Smedley (Socialist)
Wilbur L. Cross, former Governor of Connecticut (Democratic)

Results

General election

Candidates
John W. Aiken (Socialist Labor)
Raymond Baldwin, Governor of Connecticut (Republican)
Frederic C. Smedley (Socialist)
Joseph Tone, former Assistant Secretary of Labor (Democratic)

Results

Aftermath
Senator Hart resigned his seat that day, and Baldwin assumed the seat on December 27. Baldwin himself resigned in December 1949 to join the Connecticut Supreme Court of Errors.

References

Connecticut
1946
1946 Connecticut elections
Connecticut 1946
Connecticut Special
United States Senate 1946